Nationality words link to articles with information on the nation's poetry or literature (for instance, Irish or France).

Events

Works
 Aphra Behn – Poetical Remains
 John Hopkins
 The Triumphs of Peace, or the Glories of Nassau … written at the time of his Grace the Duke of Ormond's entrance into Dublin
 The Victory of Death; or the Fall of Beauty

Births
Death years link to the corresponding "[year] in poetry" article:
 January 3 – Metastasio, born Pietro Antonio Domenico Trapassi (died 1782), Italian poet and opera librettist
 January 10? – Richard Savage (died 1743), English poet
 March 22 – John Ellis (died 1791), English scrivener and poet
 May 8 – Henry Baker (died 1774), English naturalist, poet and sign-language developer
 July 19 – Johann Jakob Bodmer (died 1783), German-language Swiss, author, critic, academic and poet
 Approximate date – Alasdair mac Mhaighstir Alasdair (died 1770), Scottish Gaelic poet

Deaths
Birth years link to the corresponding "[year] in poetry" article:
 January – Dáibhí Ó Bruadair (born 1625), Irish language poet
 February 28 – Nicolò Minato (born 1627), Italian poet, librettist and impresario
 September 3 – Sir Robert Howard (born 1626), English playwright, poet and brother-in-law of John Dryden

See also

 List of years in poetry
 List of years in literature
 17th century in poetry
 17th century in literature
 Poetry

Notes

External links
 "A Timeline of Poetry in English" at the Representative Poetry Online website of the University of Toronto

17th-century poetry
Poetry